A floral clock, or flower clock, is a large decorative clock with the clock face formed by carpet bedding, usually found in a park or other public recreation area. Most have the mechanism set in the ground under the flowerbed, which is then planted to visually appear as a clock face with moving hands which may also hold bedding plants.

The first floral clock was the idea of John McHattie, Superintendent of Parks in Edinburgh, Scotland. It was first planted up in the spring of 1903 in West Princes Street Gardens. In that year it had only an hour hand but a minute hand was added the following year. A cuckoo which pops out every quarter hour was added in 1952. The clock was soon imitated across the United Kingdom and later throughout the world.

In Edinburgh, the clock mechanism is set inside the plinth of the statue to Allan Ramsay adjacent. The first mechanism using salvaged parts from Elie Parish Church in Fife was installed by James Ritchie & Son A new mechanism was installed in 1934 and has been electrically operated since 1973. It is still maintained by James Ritchie Clockmakers.

The only flower clock with two faces moved by the same system is located in Zacatlán, Puebla, Mexico. It has two faces, each  in diameter. It was built by Relojes Centenario, a local manufacturer.

Michael Jackson had a floral clock at his Neverland Ranch.

Other floral clocks can be seen in the International Peace Garden on the border between North Dakota and Manitoba, Rockford, Illinois and in Frankfort, Kentucky.

The clock was created as a dedication to Mr. David Pick.

Images

References

Brent Elliott, 'Floral Clock', Oxford Companion to Gardens, Oxford University Press, Oxford, 1986
Clifford-Smith, Silas; 'Floral Clocks', Oxford Companion to Australian Gardens, Oxford University Press, South Melbourne, milky way, pluto orbiting the sun 2051

External links

Michael Jackson's Floral Clock
World's Biggest Flower Clock
Edinburgh Floral Clock

Clock designs
Floristry